Terrance Mitchell II (born May 17, 1992) is an American football cornerback for the Tennessee Titans of the National Football League (NFL). He was drafted by the Dallas Cowboys in the seventh round of the 2014 NFL Draft. He played college football at Oregon.

Early years
Mitchell attended Luther Burbank High School in Sacramento, California, where he played cornerback and running back for the Burbank Titans high school football team.

As a senior, he earned Metro League Offensive MVP honors after registering 2,360 all-purpose yards, 48 receptions, and 24 touchdowns. On defense, he received All-Metro honors after he tallied 6 interceptions, a forced fumble and one blocked field goal.

He also lettered in basketball. Considered a three-star recruit by Rivals.com, he was listed as the No. 33 cornerback in the nation in 2010.

College career
Mitchell accepted a football scholarship from the University of Oregon. As a redshirt freshman, he earned the starting left cornerback job, registering 45 tackles, 10 passes defensed (sixth in the Pac-12), 2 interceptions and 3 forced fumbles.

As a sophomore, he tallied 40 tackles (ninth on the team) and 8 passes defensed.

As a junior, he finished with 59 tackles (ninth on the team), 7 passes defensed, 5 interceptions (led the team) and one forced fumble. He announced on January 2, 2014, that he would forgo his senior season and enter the NFL Draft.

He finished his collegiate career with 38 starts in 40 games, 144 tackles, 7 interceptions, 25 passes defensed (tied for 10th place in school history) and 4 forced fumbles.

Professional career
At the University of Oregon pro day he was able to improve on his 40-yard dash time, clocking in at 4.52.

Dallas Cowboys (first stint)
The Dallas Cowboys selected Mitchell in the seventh round (254th overall) of the 2014 NFL Draft. Mitchell was the 33rd and final cornerback drafted. His fall in the draft was speculated to be due to his performance at the NFL Combine, as teams deemed him too slow to play cornerback.

On May 15, 2014, the Dallas Cowboys signed Mitchell to a four-year, $2.26 million contract that includes a signing bonus of $45,896.

As a rookie, he was ineligible to participate in organized team activities until the University of Oregon classes ended. Throughout training camp, Mitchell competed for a roster spot as a backup cornerback against Sterling Moore, B. W. Webb, Tyler Patmon, and Dashaun Phillips. On August 30, 2014, the Dallas Cowboys waived Mitchell.

Chicago Bears
On September 1, 2014, the Chicago Bears signed Mitchell to their practice squad. On October 13, 2014, the Chicago Bears elevated Mitchell to their active roster, but remained inactive as a healthy scratch for the last ten games of the regular season.

Throughout training camp in 2015, Mitchell competed for a roster spot as a backup cornerback against Alan Ball, Demontre Hurst, Al Louis-Jean, Sherrick McManis, Jacoby Glenn, Qumain Black, and Bryce Callahan. Head coach John Fox named Mitchell the fourth cornerback on the depth chart to begin the regular season, behind Kyle Fuller, Alan Ball, and Sherrick McManis.

In 2015, a notable preseason allowed him to make the roster by beating out Tim Jennings. He was sidelined after Week 5 with a hamstring injury. On November 17, he was released to make room for cornerback Jacoby Glenn. On November 19, he was signed to the Bears' practice squad. He was released on November 23.

Dallas Cowboys (second stint) 
On December 2, 2015, he was signed by the Dallas Cowboys to the practice squad. With cornerback Orlando Scandrick out with a season ending knee injury and Tyler Patmon struggling, Mitchell was promoted to the active roster on December 18 and was named the team's nickel cornerback. In his first game against the New York Jets he registered a pass defensed and an interception, becoming one of two cornerbacks on the team to have an interception on the year. Against the Washington Redskins he sacked quarterback Colt McCoy, forcing a fumble. In three games, he registered 12 tackles, one sack, one interception and 2 passes defensed.

In 2016, he was used at nickel back and safety during Organized Team Activities. He was released on June 10.

Houston Texans (first stint) 
On June 13, 2016, Mitchell was claimed off waivers by the Houston Texans, to replace rookie cornerback Richard Leonard who suffered a torn hamstring. He was released on September 3.

Kansas City Chiefs
On September 6, 2016, Mitchell was signed to the Kansas City Chiefs' practice squad. He was promoted to the active roster on October 18, 2016. He was released on November 8, 2016 and signed to the practice squad the next day. He was promoted back to the active roster on November 25, to be the third cornerback.

In 2017, he began the season as a starter at right cornerback for seven games in place of an injured Steven Nelson. In Week 3, he recorded two interceptions and nine tackles in a 24–10 victory over the Los Angeles Chargers. His performance against the Chargers was the first multi-interception game of his professional career. On October 30, Nelson was activated to play against the Denver Broncos and Mitchell returned to a backup role behind Kenneth Acker. He finished with 9 starts out of 15 appearances and 4 interceptions.

Cleveland Browns
On March 15, 2018, Mitchell signed a three-year, $12 million contract with the Cleveland Browns, reuniting with John Dorsey who was the general manager with the Chiefs. He forced 2 fumbles and recovered one, in the second game 18-21 loss against the New Orleans Saints. He had a game-sealing interception in the third game 21-17 win against the New York Jets. Mitchell started the first four games of the season at right cornerback, before suffering a broken wrist in Week 4 against the Oakland Raiders. He was placed on injured reserve on October 2, 2018. He was activated off injured reserve on December 8, 2018. He started 3 of the last 4 games, tallying 19 tackles and 3 passes defensed. He finished the season with 38 tackles, one interception, 6 passes defensed, 2 forced fumbles and one fumble recovery.

In 2019, he appeared in 15 games with 4	starts, collecting 21 tackles and one interception. He did not play a snap in the seventh game against the New England Patriots.

In 2020, second-year player Greedy Williams was expected to be the starter at right cornerback opposite Denzel Ward, but was lost for the season with a nerve injury in his shoulder that he suffered midway through training camp. Mitchell was named the starter instead for all 16 games and both playoff contests. He posted 65 tackles (2 for loss), 3 forced fumbles and 13 passes defensed.

Houston Texans (second stint) 
On March 24, 2021, Mitchell signed a two-year contract worth up to $7.5 million with the Houston Texans. He was named a starting cornerback in 2021, recording 60 tackles, three forced fumbles, 10 passes defensed and one interceptions in 14 games and 13 starts.

On March 10, 2022, Mitchell was released by the Texans.

New England Patriots 
On March 16, 2022, Mitchell signed a one-year contract worth $3 million with the New England Patriots. He was released on August 30, 2022 and signed to the practice squad the next day.

Tennessee Titans
On September 21, 2022, Mitchell was signed by the Tennessee Titans off the Patriots practice squad. He was placed on injured reserve on December 22, 2022.

References

External links
Oregon Ducks bio

1992 births
Living people
Players of American football from Sacramento, California
American football cornerbacks
Oregon Ducks football players
Dallas Cowboys players
Chicago Bears players
Houston Texans players
Kansas City Chiefs players
Cleveland Browns players
New England Patriots players
Ed Block Courage Award recipients
Tennessee Titans players